The fifteenth season of American Dad! began with a Christmas special, which aired on December 25, 2017 on TBS. The season aired from February 12, 2018, to April 8, 2019. The series went on hiatus after the season's thirteenth episode aired May 7, 2018. The remaining 9 episodes of the season began airing on February 11, 2019.


Episode list

References

2017 American television seasons
2018 American television seasons
2019 American television seasons
American Dad! (season 15) episodes